The Wallace Group is a grouping of seven universities in the UK that have a shared interest in promoting sports and health workshops in developing countries. The members are the Cardiff Metropolitan University, Durham University, the University of Edinburgh, Loughborough University, Northumbria University, University of St Andrews and the University of Stirling; the University of Bath supports the work of the group with 
a parallel sports facility construction programme. The sports which are primarily promoted are football, volleyball, basketball and netball with education workshops focused on HIV & AIDS.

The group was formed in 2004, originally with six universities, in partnership with UK Sport and established itself in 2006. It is named after David Wallace who is affiliated to two member universities.  As a group they have worked in collaboration and have shown commitment to the establishment and sustainable practices of International Development. The focus for the group has been Zambia through the partnership with Sport in Action and EduSport. The University of Edinburgh joined in 2018.

BUCS Ranking

The universities participate annually in the British Universities and Colleges Sport Overall Championship, a ranking of around 160 member institutions' sporting achievements.

Notes:
‡ Suspended due to COVID-19 pandemic

References

College and university associations and consortia in the United Kingdom
Organizations established in 2005
Student sport in the United Kingdom
2005 establishments in the United Kingdom